The "Show or Display" rule is a statutory amendment to the United States Federal Motor Vehicle Safety Standards (FMVSS) that allows certain privately imported automobiles to be exempted, if the vehicle in question is deemed to meet a standard of "historical or technological significance".

The amendment, which became law on August 13, 1999, is intended to apply to vehicles that could not feasibly be brought into compliance with the FMVSS, including requirements for destructive testing and that do not have a similar make or model certified for sale in the United States market. Applications are managed by the National Highway Traffic Safety Administration, and may allow limited use on public roads ( annually).

The permitted vehicle list is mostly restricted to expensive sports and touring automobiles due to the cost and effort needed to import a vehicle with this exemption.

Background
The United States is not signatory to the United Nations World Forum for Harmonization of Vehicle Regulations. Until 1967, Americans were still allowed to purchase cars from overseas with no restrictions. From 1968 to 1988, Americans were permitted to purchase recent vehicles abroad and modify them to meet NHTSA and EPA design regulations, in what was known as the grey market. In 1988, Americans were largely forbidden from owning individually imported vehicles.

Detail of Law
The approval for "Show or Display" import is granted if the prospective importer is able to show historical or technological significance of the vehicle in question, and if the vehicle was produced in limited numbers (with 500 being used as a threshold value.) Import approval is granted on a combination of make, model, and production-year; thus, there is no need to re-apply for approved vehicles when further examples are imported in the future.

NHTSA originally proposed an annual mileage limitation of 500 on-road miles, and also required that a certified mileage statement be submitted annually during the first five years after import. During a comment period on the wording of the statute in May 1999, the Special Vehicles Coalition recommended that the figure be increased to 2,500 miles (a figure already in use by the insurance industry as a threshold to describe a limited-use vehicle.) The Coalition also recommended the elimination of the annual mileage statement requirement, as such a statement would not accurately reflect on-road mileage for vehicles that are also used off public roads. Both recommendations were incorporated into the final wording of the statute, though NHTSA retains the right to inspect an imported vehicle for the purpose of verifying mileage.

Citing unspecified concerns about public safety, NHTSA reserves the right to approve a vehicle for "Show or Display" import, but disallow it from being registered for use on public roads. The administration also reserves the right, at the time of import, to place any other arbitrary restrictions or limitations on the use of an imported vehicle. Regardless of "Show or Display" approval, imported vehicles must also meet the import restrictions defined by the Environmental Protection Agency (EPA).

NHTSA does not require FMVSS compliance for any imported vehicles that are above a certain age, currently 25 years.

Notable examples
Microsoft founder Bill Gates bought a Porsche 959 which did not have Department of Transportation and Environmental Protection Agency approval. The contraband car was stored for 13 years by the Customs Service at the Port of San Francisco, until the Show or Display rule came into force so it could be released into his custody.

Vehicles eligible 

, these are the only cars that have been approved for import under the Show or Display exception. Some of these models have since passed the 25 year mark, meaning that both they and even the less-limited versions of the same car (i.e., the non-Nismo Nissan Skyline R32) are exempt from import restrictions anyway.

References

External links
 

United States Department of Transportation
Vehicle law